Puadhi, sometimes spelled Pwadhi or Powadhi, is an adjective that may refer to:
 Puadh, a region in northern India
 Puadhi dialect, the Punjabi variety spoken in the region
 Powadhi, a subsection of the Marri tribe of Balochistan, Pakistan